P. amphibius may refer to:
 Protopterus amphibius, a lungfish species
 Puntius amphibius, the scarlet-banded barb, a fish species

See also
 Amphibius (disambiguation)